There were three special elections to the United States House of Representatives in 2015 during the 115th United States Congress.

All of the elections were won by the party previously holding the seat. Therefore, there were no net changes in party.

Elections are sorted by date and district.

Summary 

|-
| 
| Michael Grimm
| 
| 2010
|  | Incumbent resigned December 30, 2014.A special election was held May 5, 2015.Republican hold.
| nowrap | 

|-
| 
| Alan Nunnelee
| 
| 2010
|  | Incumbent died February 6, 2015.A special election was held May 12, 2015.Republican hold.
| nowrap | 

|-
| 
| Aaron Schock
| 
| 2008
|  | Incumbent resigned March 31, 2015.A special election was held September 10, 2015.Republican hold.
| nowrap | 

|}

New York's 11th congressional district 

A special election was held on May 5, 2015, to fill the vacancy of Michael Grimm, who resigned from Congress on January 5, 2015, after pleading guilty to tax evasion. Local party leaders in Brooklyn and Staten Island selected their nominees, replacing a primary. Republican nominee Dan Donovan was elected to the seat, defeating his Democratic challenger Vincent J. Gentile.

Mississippi's 1st congressional district 

Representative Alan Nunnelee died on February 6, 2015, after health complications with his brain. Governor Phil Bryant called for a nonpartisan blanket primary to be held on May 12, 2015, with a runoff between the top two finishers on June 2, 2015. The primary consisted of thirteen candidates, with all but one being affiliated with the Republican Party. In the runoff, Republican Trent Kelly defeated Democrat Walter Zinn by a wide margin.

Illinois's 18th congressional district 

A special election was held on September 10, 2015, following the resignation of Aaron Schock on March 31, 2015, amid a scandal involving his use of public and campaign funds. Primary elections were set for July 7 to comply with the UOCAVA, despite Illinois law calling for a stricter deadline. Republican nominee Darin LaHood defeated Democratic nominee Rob Mellon by over thirty percentage points.

References 

 
2015